This is a list of the National Register of Historic Places listings in Apostle Islands National Lakeshore.

This is intended to be a complete list of the properties and districts on the National Register of Historic Places in Apostle Islands National Lakeshore, Wisconsin, United States.  The locations of National Register properties and districts for which the latitude and longitude coordinates are included below, may be seen in a Google map.

There are thirteen properties and districts listed on the National Register in the park.

Current listings 

|--
|}

See also 
 National Register of Historic Places listings in Ashland County, Wisconsin
 National Register of Historic Places listings in Bayfield County, Wisconsin
 National Register of Historic Places listings in Wisconsin

References